Grevillea 'Honey Gem' is a grevillea cultivar originating from Queensland in Australia.

Flowers occur mainly in winter and spring.

The cultivar is a cross between Grevillea banksii (red form) and Grevillea pteridifolia. The original plant was obtained as a seedling of Grevillea pteridifolia by Cherrel Jerks of Taringa in Brisbane, Queensland.

It is a very vigorous cultivar and reliable in most gardens, though it flowers for only 6 months of the year or so.  Needing a well-drained soil, it is otherwise vulnerable to 'collar rot'.

See also
 List of Grevillea cultivars

References
Australian Cultivar Registration Authority: Grevillea 'Honey Gem'

Honey
Cultivars of Australian plants
Proteales of Australia
Garden plants of Australia